Qaranqu Rural District is in the Central District of Hashtrud County, East Azerbaijan province, Iran. At the National Census of 2006, its population was 11,929 in 2,551 households. There were 10,858 inhabitants in 3,021 households at the following census of 2011. At the most recent census of 2016, the population of the rural district was 10,263 in 3,208 households. The largest of its 47 villages was Zu ol Bin, with 1,309 people.

References 

Hashtrud County

Rural Districts of East Azerbaijan Province

Populated places in East Azerbaijan Province

Populated places in Hashtrud County